22nd National Board of Review Awards
December 20, 1950
The 22nd National Board of Review Awards were announced on December 20, 1950.

Top Ten Films 
Sunset Boulevard
All About Eve
The Asphalt Jungle
The Men
Edge of Doom
Twelve O'Clock High
Panic in the Streets
Cyrano de Bergerac
No Way Out
Stage Fright

Top Foreign Films 
The Titan: Story of Michelangelo
Tight Little Island
The Third Man
Kind Hearts and Coronets
Paris 1900

Winners 
Best Film: Sunset Boulevard
Best Foreign Language Film: The Titan
Best Actor: Alec Guinness (Kind Hearts and Coronets)
Best Actress: Gloria Swanson (Sunset Boulevard)
Best Director: John Huston (The Asphalt Jungle)

External links 
 National Board of Review of Motion Pictures :: Awards for 1950

1950
1950 film awards
1950 in American cinema